Featherstone is a civil parish in the district of South Staffordshire, Staffordshire, England. It contains three listed buildings that are recorded in the National Heritage List for England. Of these, one is at Grade II*, the middle of the three grades, and the others are at Grade II, the lowest grade. The parish contains the village of Featherstone and the surrounding area. The listed buildings consist of a house with associated structures, a cottage, and agricultural buildings, all of which are timber framed or have timber framed cores.


Key

Buildings

References

Citations

Sources

Lists of listed buildings in Staffordshire
South Staffordshire District